Jeannette Morven Campbell (8 March 1916 – 15 January 2003) was a naturalized Argentine swimmer who won the silver medal in the 1936 Summer Olympics. She was the first Argentine female to participate at the Olympic Games.

Early  life 
She was born in Saint-Jean-de-Luz, France, when her parents were traveling through Europe.

Career 
Her sister, Dorothy, was Argentina's 100 m freestyle champion. She followed her sister to become the Argentine record holder in 100 m in 1932, with a 1:18:6 time. In 1935, she became the South American record holder in the 100 m (1:08:0) and in the 400 m. During the 1936 Olympics, she broke the 100 m Olympic record in the semifinals with a 1:06:6 time. She finished second to Hendrika Mastenbroek in the final 100 meters swim, with a 1:06:4 time.

She was the flag bearer for Argentina at the opening ceremony of the 1964 Summer Olympics held in Tokyo, Japan.

Jeanette died in Buenos Aires, Argentina in 2003. She was the wife of Roberto Peper and the mother of two girls, Inés and Susana, and a boy, Roberto Jr.

References

External links
profile

1916 births
2003 deaths
People from Saint-Jean-de-Luz
Citizens of Argentina through descent
Argentine people of Scottish descent
Argentine people of American descent
Argentine female swimmers
French emigrants to Argentina
Argentine female freestyle swimmers
Olympic swimmers of Argentina
Swimmers at the 1936 Summer Olympics
Olympic silver medalists for Argentina
Medalists at the 1936 Summer Olympics
Olympic silver medalists in swimming